The following is a list of National Association of Intercollegiate Athletics conferences as of the 2022–23 school year.  Unless otherwise noted, changes in conference membership occur on July 1 of the given year.

Current conferences

Football

Notes

Non-football

Notes

Defunct conferences

Football
 Arkansas Intercollegiate Conference (1928–1995)
 Central States Intercollegiate Conference (1976–1989)
 Dakota Athletic Conference (2000–2012)
 Eastern Intercollegiate Athletic Conference (closed in 2003)
 Evergreen Conference (1948–1984)
 Great Plains Athletic Conference (1972–1976)
 Hoosier–Buckeye Conference (1948–1985)
 Missouri College Athletic Union (1924–1970)
 Nebraska College Conference (1916–1976)
 North Dakota College Athletic Conference (closed in 2000)
 Oklahoma Collegiate Athletic Conference (1929–1973), formerly the Oklahoma Collegiate Conference
 Oklahoma Intercollegiate Conference (1974–1997)
 Pacific Northwest Athletic Conference (1984–1998)
 South Dakota Intercollegiate Conference (closed in 2000)
 South East Atlantic Conference (2004–2008), football only, members became NAIA football independents
 Southern States Conference (1938–1997), formerly the Alabama Intercollegiate Conference and the Alabama Collegiate Conference
 Tri-State Conference (1960–1981)
 Volunteer State Athletic Conference (1940s–early 1980s)
 West Virginia Intercollegiate Athletic Conference (1924–2013), transferred to the NCAA in 1994. Most of the final WVIAC members are now in the NCAA Division II Mountain East Conference.

Notes

Non-football
 American Mideast Conference (1949–2012)
 Midlands Collegiate Athletic Conference (1994–2015)
 Midwest Collegiate Conference (1988–2015)
 Northeastern Intercollegiate Athletics Conference (2016–2019)
 Sunrise Athletic Conference (2002–2011)
 TranSouth Athletic Conference (1996–2013)

Notes

Former conferences
All transferred to the NCAA.

Football
 Lone Star Conference (1931–1982)
 Minnesota Intercollegiate Athletic Conference (1920–1982)
 Northern Sun Intercollegiate Conference (1932–1995), known as Northern Intercollegiate Conference until 1962
 Northwest Conference (1926–1996), Pacific Northwest Conference before 1984 and Northwest Conference of Independent Colleges until 1996
 Upper Midwest Athletic Conference (1972–2008)

Non-football
 Central Atlantic Collegiate Conference (1961–2002)
 Conference Carolinas (1930–1995), known as Carolinas Intercollegiate Athletic Conference until 1961, held dual membership with the NCAA for two years starting in 1993
 Dixie Conference (1963–1973), became the USA South Athletic Conference in 2003

See also
List of college athletic conferences in the United States

References

External links

NAIA Member Schools